Lycée Saint-Exupéry is a senior high school/sixth-form college in Blagnac, Haute-Garonne, France, in the Toulouse Métropole.

It was established in 2004 with 550 students; the enrollment reached 1,200 by 2007.  it had 1,785 students.

References

External links
 Lycée Saint-Exupéry 

Lycées in Haute-Garonne
2004 establishments in France
Educational institutions established in 2004